William Emery Barnes  (1859–1939) was an English academic, most notably Hulsean Professor of Divinity at the University of Cambridge from 1901 until 1934.

Early life and education

Barnes was born on 26 May 1859 in Islington. He was educated at Islington Proprietary School and Peterhouse, Cambridge.

Career

He was ordained in 1884 and served his title at St John's Church, Waterloo. He was a lecturer in Hebrew at Clare College, Cambridge, from 1885 to 1894; and in divinity at Peterhouse, Cambridge, from 1889 to 1901. He was Dean of Peterhouse from 1920 to 1921; Examining Chaplain to the Bishop of Peterborough from 1920 to 1927; and Canon Theologian of Leicester from 1932 until his death on 17 August 1939 in Exeter.

Publications
 Canonical and Uncanonical Gospels, 1893
 The Peshitta Text of Chronicles, 1897
 The Psalms in the Peshitta Version, 1904
 Lex in Corde (studies in the Psalter), 1910
 Early Christians at Prayer, 1925
 The Forgivenesses of Jesus Christ, 1936

References

External links
 World cat
 Biblical Studies

People educated at Islington Proprietary School
19th-century English Anglican priests
20th-century English Anglican priests
People from Islington (district)
People from Stradbroke
Alumni of Peterhouse, Cambridge
Hulsean Professors of Divinity
1859 births
1939 deaths
English Anglican theologians
British Hebraists